Madi Diaz (born May 14, 1986) is an American singer-songwriter and musician.

Early life
Diaz grew up in Lancaster County, Pennsylvania, where she was home-schooled by her Peruvian mother, Nancy, a proponent of early childhood development and the visual arts, and her Danish father, Eric, a woodworker and musician. Diaz began piano lessons at age five from her father.

In her early teens, Diaz switched from piano to guitar. She was featured in Rock School, director Don Argott's 2005 documentary about the program as Madi Diaz-Svalgard. Her father Eric Svalgård is a member of the Frank Zappa tribute band Project/Object.

Music career
After high school, Diaz was accepted to Berklee College of Music. At Berklee, she began working with Kyle Ryan, the Nebraska-raised guitarist who would be her songwriting collaborator for her early career. The two began their collaboration when a fellow student, a producer looking for a project, offered Diaz the chance to record an album in Hawaii. The self-released album Skin And Bones (2007) was the result, and a songwriting and performing partnership between Diaz and Ryan stuck. Shortly after, Diaz dropped out of the program at Berklee.

In 2008, Diaz and Ryan continued writing and began playing shows in New York City. There, she met her manager and signed to publisher Cherry Lane Music. Diaz and Ryan were then sent to Nashville for a month to write, and in mid-2010 moved to Nashville.

After releasing the EP, Ten Gun Salute, Diaz began touring with The Civil Wars and Landon Pigg. She was featured in Paste magazine as one of the "Top Ten Buzziest Acts" at SXSW 2009, and had songs featured on cw The originals ABC Family's Pretty Little Liars, and Lifetime's Drop Dead Diva, Army Wives, and Princesses: Long Island.

Her EP, Far from the Things That We Know, was released on September 20, 2011, by TinyOGRE Entertainment.  The EP was recorded in Los Angeles and Charlottesville, VA with John Alagia (Dave Matthews Band, John Mayer) serving as producer. The EP previewed songs from her full-length album, Plastic Moon, which was released in January 2012.

In February 2012, Diaz moved to Los Angeles, marking a new chapter in her music career. Now working solo, her next album, We Threw Our Hearts in the Fire, was released on October 23, 2012.

Diaz appeared as a guest on Last Call with Carson Daly on the January 13, 2014 episode. She released the single "Stay Together" on July 11, 2014. It is the first single off of her album, Phantom, which was released in September 2014.

The song "The End of the Day," written by Diaz and Sarah Siskind, was featured on the television series Nashville, and is performed by Connie Britton and Charles Esten.

In 2018, Diaz provided the vocals for Dan Romer's track, "Help Me Faith", from the soundtrack of the videogame, Far Cry 5.

On February 11, 2021, ANTI- Records announced that Diaz had signed with them, alongside the release of her first single with the label titled "Man In Me".

Discography
 Skin and Bone (April 11, 2007)
 Ten Gun Salute EP (December 5, 2008)
 Far from the Things That We Know EP (September 20, 2011)
 Plastic Moon (January 24, 2012) – No. 20 on Billboard Heatseekers Album Chart
 We Threw Our Hearts in the Fire (October 23, 2012)
 Phantom (September 30, 2014)
 It's Okay to Be Alone EP (August 2, 2018)
  History of a Feeling (August 27, 2021)
 Same History, New Feelings EP (March 4, 2022)

Collaborations 
 RAC 
 Joshua Radin
 Lester Mendez 
 Viceroy 
 Jensen Sportag 
 Joseph Arthur 
 Nick Ruth 
 Mindy Smith 
 Magic Man
 Rob Cantor 
 Gold Fields
 Joe Hawley, Ross Federman, and Bora Karaca of Tally Hall on vocals for the track "Black Rainbows" on the album "Hawaii: Part II".
 Andrew Heringer 
 Miranda Lambert – Background vocals on "The Weight Of These Wings"
 Dan Romer - Help Me Faith - Dan Romer ft. Madi Diaz from Far Cry 5 "Into The Flames"

References

External links
 
 American Songwriter Interview
 Marie Claire Interview

Living people
American women singer-songwriters
American folk singers
Musicians from Lancaster, Pennsylvania
Musicians from Los Angeles
Berklee College of Music alumni
Singer-songwriters from California
Singer-songwriters from Pennsylvania
1986 births
21st-century American singers
21st-century American women singers
Nettwerk Music Group artists